Edward Waterman Townsend (February 10, 1855 – March 15, 1942) was an American Democratic Party politician who represented New Jersey's 7th congressional district in the United States House of Representatives from 1911 to 1913, and the 10th district from 1913 to 1915, after redistricting following the United States Census, 1910.

Biography
Townsend was born in Cleveland, Ohio on February 10, 1855; his father was Horace Gilbert Townsend. He attended private and public schools in that city. He went to San Francisco, California in 1875 and engaged in newspaper and literary work. He married Annie Lake on April 16, 1884.

He moved to New York City in 1893 and continued his reportorial and literary pursuits. In 1900, he became a resident of Montclair, New Jersey. 

He was an author of novels, plays, short stories, as well as a textbook on the United States Constitution.  His most popular fictional writings were his "Chimmie Fadden" Bowery boy stories.

United States House of Representatives
Townsend was elected as a Democrat to the Sixty-second and Sixty-third Congresses, serving in office from March 4, 1911 to March 3, 1915, but was an unsuccessful candidate for reelection in 1914 to the Sixty-fourth Congress.

After leaving Congress, he served as postmaster of Montclair from 1915 to 1923. Townsend moved to New York City in 1924 and resumed newspaper and literary pursuits, and was a member of the National Institute of Arts and Letters.

Death
He died in New York City on March 15, 1942, and was interred in Forest Hill Cemetery in Utica, New York.

References

External links

 
 
 
 Edward Waterman Townsend at The Political Graveyard
 
 Article on Edward W. Townsend in August-September 1895 edition of The Bookman (New York)

1855 births
1942 deaths
People from Montclair, New Jersey
Democratic Party members of the United States House of Representatives from New Jersey
20th-century American novelists
Burials at Forest Hill Cemetery (Utica, New York)